Juan Jiménez may refer to:

 Juan Jiménez de Montalvo (born 1551), Spanish colonial administrator
 Juan Isidro Jimenez Pereyra (1846–1919), Dominican politician 
 Juan Ramón Jiménez (1881–1958), Spanish poet
 Juan Jiménez Mayor (born 1964), Peruvian politician, Prime Minister of Peru
 Juan Jiménez Méndez (born 1886), Mexican politician, Governor of Oaxaca
 Juan Jiménez (baseball) (1949–2008), Dominican baseball player
 Juan Antonio Jiménez (born 1959), Spanish equestrian 
 Juan Carlos Jiménez Rufino (born 1951), Argentine singer a.k.a. La Mona Jiménez 
 Juanmi (footballer, born 1993), Spanish footballer

See also
 Juan Giménez (1943-2020), Argentine comic book artist